20 August 1955 Stadium is a multi-purpose stadium in Mohamed Belouizdad, Algiers, Algeria.  It is currently used mostly for football matches and is the home ground of CR Belouizdad.  The stadium holds 20,000 people. It’s in the city.

History
Stade 20 Août 1955 was completed during the French colonial era in 1930, and since its inauguration, it has been equipped to receive about 8,000 spectators only. The viewer can see a skating side near the stands at the 1975 Mediterranean Games hosted in Algiers and at the 1978 All-Africa Games, the relay competition was held by the clock in this stadium, and was the most important stadium that France left, used by the Algerians after independence, accompanied by Omar Hamadi Stadium and Mohamed Benhaddad Stadium in Algiers, and remained the stadium where Algeria receives its great guests Before the inauguration of Stade du 5 Juillet in 1972 during the reign of President Houari Boumediene who became the home of the Algeria national football team.

The Greens played in this stadium many unforgettable matches after independence, as they won against West Germany with two goals. Over 10 years after independence in this stadium, only lost twice against Tunisia in an official match and against FC Nantes in a friendly match, and they beat many teams and scored draws against Morocco, Egypt and other teams until they played the last game in this ancient stadium on 21 March 1971 against Mali and tied with two goals in each net in the qualifications for the Munich Olympics and were eliminated from the competition that took place in 1972.

Accidents
On November 26, 1982 in the meeting of the 7th round of the national championship between NA Hussein Dey and MC Alger, which witnessed a record attendance for supporters to watch the stars of the “Gijon” epic after the 1982 FIFA World Cup, which led to the collapse of the side stands of the stadium and the accident resulted in the death of ten supporters and the injury of more than 500 supporters. to mark the biggest tragedy that Algerian stadiums have known since independence.

On August 22, 2019, the Algerian singer and rapper Soolking held a large concert which was attended by more than 30 thousand fans. He was accompanied by a group of artists namely L'Algérino, Fianso, Alonzo and Dhurata Dora. During entering the stadium 5 people died due to the stampede Two girls aged 19 and 22 and three boys aged 13, 16 and 21 They died during their transfer to Mustapha Pacha hospital (CHU), ”said Captain Nassim Bernaoui. In the process, 32 wounded were also evacuated to the CHU of the capital. "They left the hospital the next day," said the same source.. Soolking said after the end of the concert that if he knew what happened he would have cancel the party, and one of the reasons for the accident was that tickets were sold more than the stadium capacity. with the dismissals of the boss of ONDA, organizer of the event the head of the national police and the Minister of Culture. While awaiting the conclusions of the investigation the various parties turn responsibility for the tragedy to each other. « It was 4 p.m. when the stadium's doors were opened to welcome an already large flow of fans, some of whom arrived in the morning, says Captain Nassim Bernaoui, Civil Protection communications manager. In front of the entrances, the security guards filtered the public in dribbles. The closer the time for the start of the concert, the more eager the public was to enter the stadium, "he recalls, recalling that" massive regroupings are the second major risk in Algeria».

References

External links 
 File stadium – goalzz.com

20 Aout
Sports venues in Algiers
Sport in Algiers
Multi-purpose stadiums in Algeria
1930 establishments in Algeria
Sports venues completed in 1930